Jasmin Strachan (born 20 August 1978) is a Filipino taekwondo practitioner, born in Tondo, Manila. She competed at the 2000 Summer Olympics in Sydney. She won a bronze medal in welterweight at the 1998 Asian Taekwondo Championships, and a bronze medal in featherweight at the 2000 Asian Taekwondo Championships.

References

External links

1978 births
Living people
People from Tondo, Manila
Filipino female taekwondo practitioners
Olympic taekwondo practitioners of the Philippines
Taekwondo practitioners at the 2000 Summer Olympics
Asian Taekwondo Championships medalists
21st-century Filipino women